In biology, semiaquatic can refer to various types of animals that spend part of their time in water, or plants that naturally grow partially submerged in water. Examples are given below.

Semiaquatic animals
Semiaquatic animals include:
 Vertebrates
 Amphibious fish; also several types of normally fully aquatic fish such as the grunion and plainfin midshipman that spawn in the intertidal zone
 Some amphibians such as newts and salamanders, and some frogs such as fire-bellied toads and wood frogs.
 Some reptiles such as crocodilians, turtles, water snakes and marine iguanas.
 Penguins.
 Some rodents such as beavers, muskrats and capybaras.
Some insectivorous mammals such as desmans, water shrews and platypuses.
 Some carnivoran mammals, including seals, polar bears and otters.
 Hippopotamuses.
 Semiterrestrial echinoderms of the intertidal zone, such as the "cliff-clinging" sea urchin Colobocentrotus atratus and the starfish Pisaster ochraceus
Arthropods
 Aquatic insects (e.g., dragonflies) with at least one nonaquatic life-cycle stage (e.g., adults), or amphibious insects (e.g., amphibious caterpillars or the ant Polyrhachis sokolova). Members of the hemipteran infraorders Gerromorpha and Nepomorpha occupy a variety of semiaquatic and aquatic niches, with many of the former locomoting on the water surface; a few of these are marine (e.g., Halobates, Hermatobates).
 Semiaquatic springtails, such as Anurida maritima
 Semiterrestrial malacostracan crustaceans (e.g., many crabs, such as Pachygrapsus marmoratus, some amphipods, such as Orchestia gammarellus, some isopods, such as Ligia oceanica and some barnacles, such as Balanus glandula)
 Horseshoe crabs are mostly aquatic but spawn in the intertidal zone; juveniles live in tidal flats
 Semiaquatic spiders, such as Ancylometes or Dolomedes (these are distinct from the almost fully aquatic Argyroneta)
 An amphibious centipede, Scolopendra cataracta
 Semiaquatic annelids, such as the earthworm Sparganophilus
 Molluscs
 Intertidal bivalves, such as Enigmonia, which lives on mangroves
 Intertidal chitons, such as Acanthopleura granulata
 Semiterrestrial gastropods, such as the intertidal Patella vulgata, a limpet; also amphibious freshwater and marine snails, such as Pomatiopsis or Cerithideopsis scalariformis, respectively
 Semiterrestrial flatworms of the intertidal zone, such as the acotylean Myoramyxa pardalota

Semiaquatic plants
Semiaquatic plants include:
 Semiaquatic angiosperms (e.g., mangroves, water spinach, water cabbage, and the entire order Nymphaeales)
 Semiaquatic conifers, such as pond cypress
 Semiaquatic ferns, such as Pilularia americana
 A semiaquatic horsetail, Equisetum fluviatile
 Semiaquatic quillworts, such as Isoetes melanospora
 Semiaquatic club mosses, such as Lycopodiella inundata
 Semiaquatic mosses, such as  Sphagnum macrophyllum
 Semiaquatic liverworts, such as Riccia fluitans

Notes

References 

Broad-concept articles
Aquatic ecology